"L'amore è femmina" is a song recorded by Italian singer-songwriter Nina Zilli for her second studio album of the same title. It was produced by Michele Canova and written by Zilli herself with American songwriter Charlie Mason (later won the Eurovision Song Contest 2014) and Swedish songwriters Christian Rabb, Kristoffer Sjökvist and Frida Molander. The song was selected by the Italian Broadcaster RAI to represent Italy in the Eurovision Song Contest 2012, which was held in Baku, Azerbaijan. 
During the contest, it was performed in English-Italian language, titled "L'amore è femmina (Out of Love)".

Background and composition
The song was originally written in English by Christian Rabb, Kristoffer Sjökvist, Frida Molander and Charlie Mason. A demo of the song was later sent to Zilli's manager, Fabrizio Giannini. After hearing the song, Zilli translated the lyrics in Italian and recorded it with the title "L'amore è femmina". The song was chosen as the sixth track of her second studio album, named after the song itself.

Explaining the meaning of the song, Zilli claimed that the lyrics are written from the point of view of a woman telling her man that he should not expect anything from her if he acts "like a stupid". Zilli also stated that the song contains references to sensual love, specifying that she didn't intend to write a sort of new "Material Girl".

Critical reception
OndaRock.it's Claudio Fabretti described the song as "an essay of muffled vocalism, counterpointed with a lot of choruses and wind instruments on a rocking rhythm".

Eurovision Song Contest
During the Final of the 2012 Sanremo Music Festival, Nina Zilli was announced by the ESC 2011 winners Ell & Nikki as the singer who would represent Italy at the 2012 Eurovision Song Contest. One week later, her Sanremo entry, "Per sempre", was confirmed as the song chosen to represent Italy at the Eurovision Song Contest 2012. However, on 13 March 2012, RAI and Universal Music Italy announced that the Italian entry to the Eurovision Song Contest would be the title-track of her second studio album, L'amore è femmina.

The version that represented Italy in the Eurovision Song Contest 2012 was mostly sung in English, but it kept some of its parts in Italian. It was presented on 23 March 2012, at Eurovision's official website. A video of Zilli singing the song inside the studio was uploaded on their YouTube channel.

As Italy is one of the Eurovision's "Big Five", she automatically qualified for the final, where she finished in 9th place with 101 points.

Music videos
On 23 March 2012, a preview video for "L'amore è femmina (Out of Love)" was uploaded on Eurovision.tv's YouTube channel. It shows Zilli inside the studio singing the international version of the song that represented Italy in Eurovision 2012.

The official music video, featuring the Italian-language version of the song, later premiered on 7 May 2012 on Gazzetta TV. The video, directed by Cosimo Alemà and filmed in March 2012 at a palazzo in EUR, Rome, focuses on Zilli, who is accompanied by six male dancers. The video for the international version of the song that represented Italy in Eurovision was eventually released on 10 March 2012.

Live performances
The song was presented for the first time on a TV show on 25 April 2012, when Zilli performed live the Italian-language version of the song on the Italian programme Quelli che... il Calcio. The song was also included in the setlist of her L'amore è femmina tour, which started on 10 April 2012 in Florence.

Track listing
 Digital Download
 "L'amore è femmina (Out of Love)" – 3:01

Charts

Release history

References

2012 singles
Nina Zilli songs
Eurovision songs of 2012
Eurovision songs of Italy
Italian-language songs
Macaronic songs
Songs with lyrics by Charlie Mason (lyricist)
Universal Music Group singles
2011 songs
Song recordings produced by Michele Canova
English-language Italian songs